, commonly called , is Japan's oldest film magazine and began publication in July 1919. It was first published three times a month, using the Japanese Jun (旬) system of dividing months into three parts, but the postwar Kinema Junpō has been published twice a month.

The magazine was founded by a group of four students, including Saburō Tanaka, at the Tokyo Institute of Technology (Tokyo Technical High School at the time). In that first month, it was published three times on days with a "1" in them. These first three issues were printed on art paper and had four pages each. Kinejun initially specialized in covering foreign films, in part because its writers sided with the principles of the Pure Film Movement and strongly criticized Japanese cinema. It later expanded coverage to films released in Japan. While long emphasizing film criticism, it has also served as a trade journal, reporting on the film industry in Japan and announcing new films and trends.

After their building was destroyed in the Great Kantō earthquake in September 1923, the Kinejun offices were moved to the city of Ashiya in the Hanshin area of Japan, though the main offices are now back in Tokyo.

The Kinema Junpo awards began in 1926, and their 10 best list is considered iconic and prestigious.

Kinema Junpo Top 10

Japanese Films of All Time (2009 list)

Non-Japanese Films of All Time (2009 list)

Japanese Animated Films of All Time (2009 list)

Non-Japanese Animated Films of All Time (2010 list)

Movie star and Director of the 20th century

Japanese

Foreign

Annual award categories
There are ten categories of awards:
Best Film
Best Director
Best Foreign Film
Best Foreign Director
Best Actor
Best Actress
Best Supporting Actor
Best Supporting Actress
Best New Actor
Best New Actress

References

External links
  (Japanese language)
 Kinema Junpo on IMDb

1919 establishments in Japan
Film magazines published in Japan
Magazines established in 1919
Magazines published in Tokyo
Semimonthly magazines